The 2003 Sokoto State gubernatorial election occurred on April 19, 2003. ANPP candidate Attahiru Bafarawa won the election, defeating PDP Abdallah Wali and 4 other candidates.

Results
Attahiru Bafarawa from the ANPP won the election. 6 candidates contested in the election.

The total number of registered voters in the state was 1,476,691, total votes cast was 1,014,573, valid votes was 925,711 and rejected votes was 88,862.

Attahiru Bafarawa, (ANPP)- 665,545
Abdallah Wali, PDP- 245,047
Bello Isiyaka, APGA- 8,515
Garba Aliyu Dogondaji, AD- 5,764
Tambari Ahmed, UNPP- 508
Inuwa Abdulkadir, NDP- 332

References 

Sokoto State gubernatorial election
Sokoto State gubernatorial election
2003